Irving García or Garcia may refer to:

 Irving Garcia (boxer) (born 1979), Puerto Rican former boxer
 Irving Garcia (soccer, born 1988), American soccer player
 Irving García (footballer, born 1991), Mexican footballer